Kuyutamak (Köyöktamaq) is a rural locality (a village) in Verkhnebishindinsky Selsoviet, Tuymazinsky District, Bashkortostan, Russia. The population was 42 as of 2010. There are 2 streets.

Geography 
Kuyutamak is located 29 km southwest of Tuymazy (the district's administrative centre) by road. Imangulovo is the nearest rural locality.

References 

Rural localities in Tuymazinsky District